Badamlı (also, Badamly, until 2003; Badamlısu and Badamlysu) is a settlement and municipality in the Shahbuz District of Nakhchivan, Azerbaijan. It is located in the near of the Shahbuz-Badamly highway, 12 km in the south-west from the district center. Its population is busy with animal husbandry and mainly engaged in the production of mineral water Badamly. There are secondary school, culture house, library and a communication branch in the settlement. It has a population of 635.

History
It is located in the southern slope of the ridge of the Daralayaz. The settlement was built in 1964 on the basis of the Badamly mineral water plant.

References 

Populated places in Shahbuz District